Wong Sawang station is a Bangkok MRT station on the Purple Line. The station opened on 6 August 2016 and is located on Bangkok-Nonthaburi road, near its intersection with Wong Sawang Road in Bangkok. The station has four entrances.

References 

MRT (Bangkok) stations